Zachary Tang is an American professional dancer who currently performs with RUBBERBANDance Group.

Born in Webster, Texas, Tang is a 2007 graduate of Houston's High School for the Performing and Visual Arts. He then attended the Juilliard School in New York City, where he earned a Bachelor of Fine Arts degree in 2011.

Tang joined the San Francisco based Alonzo King LINES Ballet in 2011. He was named one of "25 to Watch" by Dance Magazine in 2012.

References 

American male ballet dancers
Juilliard School alumni
People from Webster, Texas
Living people
1988 births